Maria the Maid is a 1936 German drama film directed by Veit Harlan and starring Hilde Körber, Hilde Hildebrand, and Alfred Abel. It was shot at the Johannisthal Studios in Berlin. The film's sets were designed by the art directors Erich Grave and Hans Minzloff.

Cast

References

Bibliography

External links 
 

1936 films
Films of Nazi Germany
German drama films
1936 drama films
1930s German-language films
Films directed by Veit Harlan
Tobis Film films
German black-and-white films
1930s German films
Films shot at Johannisthal Studios